The 2009 Iowa state special elections were held throughout 2009.  These elections were to fill vacancies in various state and local positions, most notably in the Iowa House of Representatives.  In 2009, neither special election had the potential to change partisan control of the Iowa House, though such races may nonetheless be viewed as predictors for future elections.  , there have been two resignations from the Iowa House in 2009, resulting in special elections in House Districts 33 and 90.

Iowa House District 90 special election
District 90 Representative John Whitaker (D) announced on July 17, 2009, that he was resigning from the Iowa House to become U.S. Department of Agriculture Farm Service Administration Director in Iowa.  Governor Chet Culver signed a proclamation on July 20 setting a special election to fill the vacancy for September 1, 2009.  Democrat Curt Hanson won the election, beating Republican Stephen Burgmeier, Fourth of July Party candidate Dan Cesar, and Independent Douglas William Philips.

Iowa House District 33 special election
District 33 Representative Dick Taylor (D) announced on October 12, 2009, that he was resigning from the Iowa House for family reasons.  Culver signed a proclamation on October 13 setting a special election to fill the vacancy for November 24, 2009.  The candidates for the seat are Republican Joshua Thurston and Democrat Kirsten Running-Marquardt.

See also
Iowa House of Representatives
2008 Iowa House of Representatives elections
Iowa General Assembly
Political party strength in U.S. states

References

Iowa General Assembly
2009
2009 Iowa elections